Adhikari railway station is a small railway station in Darjeeling district, West Bengal which lies on Katihar–Siliguri line. Its code is ADQ. It serves Adhikari town. The station consists of two platforms. The platforms are not well sheltered. It lacks many facilities including water and sanitation.

Major trains 

Some of the important trains that run from Adhikari are:

 Siliguri–Katihar Passenger (unreserved)
 Katihar−Siliguri Intercity Express
 Radhikapur–Siliguri DEMU
 Siliguri Jn.–Malda Court DMU
 NJP–Siliguri–Alubari Road–NJP–SGUJ Ring DEMU

References

Railway stations in Darjeeling district
Katihar railway division